Abdullah Al-Deyani (Arabic:عبد الله الدياني) (born 26 May 1986) is a Qatari footballer.

External links

References

Qatari footballers
1986 births
Living people
Mesaimeer SC players
Al-Wakrah SC players
Al-Gharafa SC players
Qatar SC players
Qatar Stars League players
Qatari Second Division players
Association football wingers